Statistics of Nadeshiko.League in the 2011 season. INAC Kobe Leonessa won the championship.

Nadeshiko League Cup was cancelled due to the devastating damage from 2011 Tōhoku earthquake and tsunami on 11 March. Season opener became Week 5 (29 April) as the earthquake made Week 1 to 4 rescheduled chaotically after 11 June. The 4 games of Week 1 scheduled on 7/30, 7/31, 7/24, 6/11, and Week 2 on 7/24, 8/6, 6/12, 6/12. Such disorder continued until Week 4.

Nadeshiko League (Division 1)

Result

League awards

Best player

Top scorers

Best eleven

Best young player

Challenge League (Division 2)

Result

East

Best Player(EAST): Mai Kyokawa, Tokiwagi Gakuen High School L.S.C.
Top scorers(EAST): Mai Kyokawa, Tokiwagi Gakuen High School L.S.C.

West

Best Player(WEST): Chiho Takahashi, F.C. Takahashi Charme
Top scorers(WEST): Akika Nishikawa, F.C. Takahashi Charme

Promotion/relegation series

Division 2 Promotion series

Qualifiers

Semi-final

Final

Japan Soccer College Ladies Promoted to Division 2 in 2012 Season.
Ehime F.C. Ladies play to Division 2 promotion/relegation Series.

Division 2 promotion/relegation series

Ehime F.C. Ladies Promoted to Division 2 in 2012 Season.
Norddea Hokkaido Relegated to Regional League (Hokkaido League) in 2012 Season.

See also
Empress's Cup

References

External links
 Nadeshiko League Official Site
Season at soccerway.com

Nadeshiko League seasons
1
L
Japan
Japan